Charles Bassett (1931–1966) was an American test pilot and astronaut.

Charles Bassett may also refer to:

 Charlie Bassett (1847–1896), American lawman and saloon keeper of the American Old West
 Charley Bassett (1863–1942), American baseball player
 Charles Bassett (basketball), American basketball coach
 Charles Philip Bassett, Canadian diplomat in the 1990s